A Hare and a Leg of Lamb is a 1742 painting by French Rococo painter and engraver Jean-Baptiste Oudry.

Description
The painting employs a  trompe-l'œil technique and shows a skinned leg of lamb behind a dead hare, depicted with its eye open and a single drop of blood hanging from the end of its nose. The hare and the leg of lamb are nailed together to a wall.

Oudry was known for his canvases featuring dead game, and A Hare and a Leg of Lamb has been described as, "uncannily real." Others have criticized the canvas as, "lifeless and inert...both highly contrived and utterly dead."

The painting was originally commissioned to be hung in a dining room.

References

Rococo paintings
1742 paintings
Paintings in the collection of the Cleveland Museum of Art
Rabbits and hares in art
Sheep in art
French paintings
Still life paintings
Trompe-l'œil paintings
Paintings about death